The following lists events from the year 2016 in Zimbabwe.

Incumbents
 President: Robert Mugabe
 First Vice President: Emmerson Mnangagwa
 Second Vice President: Phelekezela Mphoko

Events

July
 July 4 - Riots break out in the capital of Harare after police attempted to disperse a protest by taxi drivers.
 July 6 - Internet protests turn to the streets in response to fears of economic collapse.
 July 7 - As protests spread across the country, dozens are arrested.
 July 8 - Despite demands by the government to stop, protests continue to spread across the country. Mugabe blames Western sanctions for the inability to pay workers on time. A two-day strike is threatened to be in place if the government does not meet protester demands.
 July 9 - As a result of the protests, the economy cripples further.
 July 11 - Evan Mawarire, the protest leader, demands the international community put pressure on the regime.
 July 12 - Mawarire is arrested for allegedly "inciting public violence and disturbing peace".
 July 13 - A court dismisses charges against Mawarire.

References

 
Years of the 21st century in Zimbabwe
Zimbabwe
Zimbabwe
2010s in Zimbabwe